Long Branch is a stream in Boone, Audrain and Monroe counties of the U.S. state of Missouri. It is a tributary of the Salt River within the waters of Mark Twain Lake.

The stream flows generally north through western Audrain County and into southwestern Monroe County just west of the community of Tulip. The stream turns east and generally follows the Audrain-Monroe county line for approximately 17 miles.

Long Branch was so named on account of its relatively long length.

See also
List of rivers of Missouri

References

Rivers of Audrain County, Missouri
Rivers of Boone County, Missouri
Rivers of Monroe County, Missouri
Rivers of Missouri